Tewson is a surname. Notable people with the surname include:

Jane Tewson (born 1958), British charity worker 
Josephine Tewson (1931–2022), British actress
Vincent Tewson (1898–1981), British trade unionist

See also
Newson